Fyllingen Fotball was a Norwegian association football club from Fyllingsdalen, Bergen, Hordaland.

It was founded as a formally independent section of the alliance sports club Fyllingen IL on 1 January 1994. Fyllingen IL was founded on 6 June 1946. Fyllingen Fotball still uses Fyllingen IL's logo.

The club played in the Norwegian top flight in 1990, 1991 and 1993, and reached the Norwegian Cup final in 1990, where they lost 5–1 against Rosenborg. This earned them a place in the 1991–92 European Cup Winners' Cup, where they were eliminated by Atlético Madrid in the first round.

Fyllingen played in the 1. divisjon from 1994 to 1996 and in the 2. divisjon from 1997 till 2009. The last two seasons of its existence, the club played in the 3. divisjon. After the 2011 season, Fyllingen merged with Løv-Ham to create FK Fyllingsdalen, and the two clubs ceased to exist.

Merger with Løv-Ham
Løv-Ham had in the recent years taken over Fyllingen's spot as Fyllingsdalen's best football-club, but it was still Fyllingen that had the biggest support and the financial power in the borough. In the end of 2007, the two clubs started negotiation to merge the football-departments of the two clubs. If this had been a reality the goal was a budget of at least 15 million, a doubling compared to the Løv-Ham's budget in 2007. The aim was to create an organization and a name that create a stable state football team, and which in time also be able to play up in the top division. The experiment stranded when it was not achieved sufficient majority at the extraordinary annual meeting of Fyllingen. Four years later, on 28 September 2011, the members of both clubs' voted yes to a merge. The new club replaced Løv-Ham in the 2012 2. divisjon, and the two old clubs will ceased to exist. Kjetil Knutsen became head coach of the new team.

European Cup appearances

Recent history, men's team 
{|class="wikitable"
|-bgcolor="#efefef"
! Season
!
! Pos.
! Pl.
! W
! D
! L
! GS
! GA
! P
!Cup
!Notes
|-
|2001
|2. divisjon, section 2
|align=right|4
|align=right|26||align=right|14||align=right|6||align=right|6
|align=right|63||align=right|48||align=right|48
|2nd round
|
|-
|2002
|2. divisjon, section 3
|align=right |3
|align=right|26||align=right|14||align=right|4||align=right|8
|align=right|65||align=right|63||align=right|46
|1st round
|
|-
|2003
|2. divisjon, section 3
|align=right |5
|align=right|26||align=right|11||align=right|5||align=right|10
|align=right|61||align=right|56||align=right|38
|2nd round
|
|-
|2004
|2. divisjon, section 3
|align=right |5
|align=right|26||align=right|12||align=right|2||align=right|12
|align=right|56||align=right|59||align=right|38
|1st round
|
|-
|2005
|2. divisjon, section 3
|align=right |5
|align=right|26||align=right|11||7||align=right|8
|align=right|45||align=right|33||align=right|40
|2nd round
|
|-
|2006
|2. divisjon, section 3
|align=right |4
|align=right|26||align=right|13||align=right|6||align=right|7
|align=right|46||align=right|38||align=right|45
|2nd round
|
|-
|2007
||2. divisjon, section 3
|align=right |5
|align=right|26||align=right|11||align=right|7||align=right|8
|align=right|38||align=right|42||align=right|40
|1st round
|
|-
|2008
|2. divisjon, section 3
|align=right |5
|align=right|26||align=right|11||align=right|6||align=right|9
|align=right|45||align=right|51||align=right|39
|1st round
|
|-
|2009
|2. divisjon, section 3
|align=right bgcolor="#FFCCCC"| 12
|align=right|26||align=right|8||align=right|3||align=right|15
|align=right|37||align=right|64||align=right|27
|2nd round
|Relegated to 3. divisjon
|-
|2010
|3. divisjon, section Hordaland 2
|align=right |2
|align=right|22||align=right|15||align=right|2||align=right|5
|align=right|63||align=right|24||align=right|47
|3rd round
|
|-
|2011
|3. divisjon, section 7
|align=right |2
|align=right|26||align=right|20||align=right|4||align=right|2
|align=right|90||align=right|24||align=right|64
|2nd round
|
|}
Source:

References

Official website  – Discontinued

Defunct football clubs in Norway
Eliteserien clubs
Sport in Bergen
Association football clubs established in 1946
Association football clubs disestablished in 2011
1946 establishments in Norway
2011 disestablishments in Norway